Nicolas Maulini (born 5 January 1981 in Geneva) is a Swiss racing driver. He has competed in such series as International Formula Master and the Eurocup Mégane Trophy. He won the Renault Speed Trophy F2000 championship in 2004.

Racing record

Complete European Le Mans Series results 
(key) (Races in bold indicate pole position; results in italics indicate fastest lap)

References

External links
 Official website
 

1981 births
Living people
Sportspeople from Geneva
Swiss racing drivers
Formula Renault 2.0 Alps drivers
French Formula Renault 2.0 drivers
International Formula Master drivers

EuroInternational drivers
European Le Mans Series drivers
Jenzer Motorsport drivers
Le Mans Cup drivers